Volda University College ( or HVO) is one of the no-tuition state institutions in the system of higher education in Norway. It is located in the town of Volda, Møre og Romsdal county, Norway.

History
HVO was established on 1 August 1994, when the Møre og Romsdal regional college and the Volda Teachers College were merged.  HVO has a long tradition in Volda dating back to a teachers' training college which was first established here in 1895. The current rector is Johann Roppen and it has approximately 4,500 students and 350 employees (2020).

HVO is divided into four faculties: the Faculty of Humanities and Education, the Faculty of Fine and Performing Arts, the Faculty of Social Sciences and History, and the Faculty of Media and Journalism.  There are a total of 6 Master's degree programmes, 30 undergraduate study programmes, and about 300 courses offered.

HVO is host of the annual Norwegian Documentary Film Festival (since 1997,  DOKFILM), the Animation Volda Festival (since 2007), and a social environment centered on the campus' large Rokken concert venue and the Rokken Café (both opened 2005).

In the 2010 feature film Trollhunter, the main characters are said to be students at HVO.

References

External links 
 Volda University College

 
Volda
Universities and colleges in Norway
Education in Møre og Romsdal
Educational institutions established in 1994
1994 establishments in Norway